6-Br-APB is a synthetic compound that acts as a selective D1 agonist, with the (R)-enantiomer being a potent full agonist, while the (S) enantiomer retains its D1 selectivity but is a weak partial agonist. (R)-6-Br-APB and similar D1-selective full agonists like SKF-81,297 and SKF-82,958 produce characteristic anorectic effects, stereotyped behaviour and self-administration in animals, with a similar but not identical profile to that of dopaminergic stimulants such as amphetamine.

References 

1-Phenyl-2,3,4,5-tetrahydro-1H-3-benzazepines
Dopamine agonists
Bromoarenes
Allylamines
Benzazepanes